Gov. David S. Reid House is a historic house located at Reidsville, Rockingham County, North Carolina. It was built about 1881, and is a two-story, "T"-shaped, Late Victorian style frame dwelling.  It sits on a brick foundation and has a gable roof and original one-story, rear shed projection and one-story rear kitchen wing. The front facade features a hipped roof entrance porch.  It was the home of the home of North Carolina Governor David Settle Reid (1813-1891) from 1881 until his death in 1891.

It was listed on the National Register of Historic Places in 1974.  It is located in the Reidsville Historic District.

References

Houses on the National Register of Historic Places in North Carolina
Victorian architecture in North Carolina
Houses completed in 1881
Houses in Rockingham County, North Carolina
National Register of Historic Places in Rockingham County, North Carolina
Settle family residences
Historic district contributing properties in North Carolina
1881 establishments in North Carolina
Governor of North Carolina